Pleasant Screams is the eighth album by pop punk band The Queers and the sixth album released on Lookout! Records before they rescinded their master rights from the label. It was reissued by Asian Man Records with bonus tracks, all from the Today EP.

Track listing
All songs written by Joe Queer, except where noted.
 "Get a Life and Live It" - 1:58
 "See Ya Later Fuckface" (King/Weasel) - 1:58
 "I Wanna Be Happy" (Ramone/King/Weasel) - 3:05
 "Danny Vapid" - 2:03
 "I Never Got the Girl" - 2:55
 "It's Cold Outside" (The Choir) - 2:47
 "Psycho Over You" (Weasel/Dirty Walter) - 2:33
 "Generation of Swine" - 1:53
 "Tic Tic Toc" (Metal Mike Saunders) - 1:58
 "I Don't Want You Hanging Around" (Weasel) - 2:17
 "Homo" - 1:57
 "You Just Gotta Blow My Mind" (Donovan) - 2:15
 "Debbie Be True" (Fantastic Baggies) - 2:09
 "Molly Neuman" - 14:40

Reissue bonus tracks
 "Yeah Well Whatever" - 2:01
 "I Don't Wanna Go to the Moon" - 1:56
 "I've Had It with You" - 1:04
 "I'm the Boy for You" - 2:38
 "Salt Lake City" (The Beach Boys cover) - 2:25

Personnel
 Joe Queer - Guitar, Vocals
 Dangerous Dave - Bass, Keyboards, Vocals
 Matt Drastic - Drums
 Gretchen Smear - Lead Vocals on "You Just Gotta Blow My Mind"
 Philip Hill - Guitar, Vocals
 Dan Lumley - Drums on "Molly Neuman"

References

The Queers albums
2002 albums
Lookout! Records albums
Asian Man Records albums